Hac Sa Beach is a beach in Coloane, Macau. It is the largest natural beach in Macau.

Name
The name "Hac Sa", is a translation from Cantonese, literally means the famous black sand. However, to prevent the beach from disappearing due to erosion, the Macau government has refilled the beach with yellow sand artificially. The dark colour comes from the minerals in the water which is lighter than other volcanic beaches like those in Hawaii. The beach is located near Hac Sa Reservoir Country Park. A stream that originates from Hac Sa Reservoir runs through the central area of the beach.

See also
 Hac Sa Park
 List of tourist attractions in Macau

References

Coloane
Beaches of Macau
Black sand beaches